Margaret of Spain may refer to:

 Margaret of Austria, Queen of Spain (1584–1611), Queen of Spain as wife of Philip III of Spain and sister of Ferdinand II, Holy Roman Emperor
 Margaret Theresa of Spain (1651–1673), daughter of Philip IV of Spain
 Infanta Margarita, Duchess of Soria (born 1939), sister of Juan Carlos I of Spain

fr:Marguerite d'Espagne